The Commisso 'ndrina is a powerful clan of the 'Ndrangheta, a criminal and mafia-type organization in Calabria, Italy. The 'ndrina is based in Siderno, but also has a branch in the Greater Toronto Area in Canada as part of the Siderno Group. The Commisso clan is involved in international drug trafficking using family ties in Italy, Canada, the United States and Australia.

In Siderno
Girolamo Commisso was a sgarrista in the 'Ndrangheta in Siderno, making him a mid-ranking figure, until his murder in 1948. Girolamo Commisso left behind a widow and three sons Rocco Remo, Cosimo and Michele who vowed to avenge their father. In 1961, the Commisso brothers moved to Canada, settling in Toronto, but did not forget their father. The murder of Girolamo Commisso was never solved, but it was believed to have been the work of two assassins, Salvatore Scarfo and Michale Alberti, both of whom fled to Argentina afterwards.

Siderno was the fiefdom of Antonio Macrì the undisputed boss at the time. In January 1975, Macrì was killed in the First 'Ndrangheta war. His right-hand man – who was wounded in the attack on Macrì – Francesco Commisso, known "Cicciu I quagghia" ("the quail"). At Macrì death, his successor was his nephew Vincenzo Macrì, known as  u Baruni , who became the head of the locale Siderno. But his succession did not last long. Very soon another young man distinguished himself for charisma, Cosimo Commisso, son of the aforementioned Francesco Commisso "the quail", Antonio Macrì's shoulder guard, who assumed command of the locale Siderno, making the 'ndrina Commisso, the family that today bears his name, one of the most influential in the 'Ndrangheta. The hitman Cecil Kirby in his 1986 autobiography Mafia Enforcer described Francesco Commisso as the father of Cosimo Commisso. Giuseppe Commisso (u mastru) is also an influential figure in Siderno. In 1982, Alberti returned to Siderno and was promptly murdered while eating at the patio terrace of the Gourmet restaurant. Amongst the patrons eating at the Gourmet were a dozen men from Toronto with links to the three Commisso brothers. One of the men present at the Gourmet, Vincenzo "Jimmy" DeLeo, upon his return to Canada visited the Commisso brothers being held at the Kingston penitentiary; he denies that he discussed the murder of the man who killed their father with them.   

In the 1980s, the Commisso were challenged by the Costa 'ndrina over the command of Siderno. The Costas had returned from Toronto. By 1991, the feud – that spilled over to Toronto as well – ended in a victory for the Commisso clan. Officially, there were 28 dead among the Costas and eight among the Commissos. Cosimo Commisso was sentenced over the vendetta and his cousin Antonio Commisso, also known as l'avvocatu ("the lawyer"), succeeded him as the acting boss of the clan.

The Commissos are one of the 'Ndrangheta's biggest and most important clans, involved in the global cocaine business and money laundering. They were members of Camera di controllo, a provincial commission of the 'Ndrangheta formed at the end of the Second 'Ndrangheta war in September 1991, to avoid further internal conflicts. The Commissos are known to have links with the Secondigliano Alliance, considered by the authorities the most powerful Camorra group that is still active. Both organizations are allied in the trafficking and sale of cocaine and marijuana from South America, via the Netherlands.

In 1993, Cosimo Commisso was arrested, and later convicted of five murders and three attempted murders between May 1989 and July 1991, and sentenced to life imprisonment in 1998. After 26 years in prison, on 9 January 2019, the Court of Appeal of Naples acquitted Commisso in a review process "for not having committed the offense", releasing him immediately. On 13 December 2019, Commisso was arrested in the "Core Business" operation, accused of mafia association for the period in which he was under house arrest since 2015 in Perugia. On 30 January 2020, Commisso was definitively acquitted of the murders by the Supreme Court of Cassation.

On 9 August 2019, several former Greater Toronto Area residents were arrested in Calabria, including Francesco Commisso and Rocco Remo Commisso. By that time, police in Italy and in Canada were convinced that "the 'Ndrangheta's Canadian presence has become so powerful and influential that the board north of Toronto has the authority to make decisions, not only in relation to Canada's underworld, but also abroad, even back in Siderno".

In Canada
The three Commisso brothers arrived in Toronto in 1961, but the police first began to pay attention to them in 1970 when Rocco Remo Commisso was accused of using intimidation to win orders for a bakery owned by one of his uncles. The Commmisso brothers were at first associated with the Toronto  'Ndranghetisti  Michele "Mike" Racco, but moved closer to another 'Ndranghetisti Rocco Zito during the 1970s; Zito was a pallbearer at Racco's funeral in 1980. Zito was known as an advocate of closer ties with the Montreal underworld, a stance shared by the Commisso brothers, while Racco wanted to keep a distance from the Montreal underworld. Racco sat on La Camera di Controllo, the board that governed 'Ndranghta activities in Toronto, making him one of the most important 'Ndranghetisti in Canada. During visits to his hometown of Siderno in 1971 and again in 1972, Rocco was the target of assassination attempts, being fired upon during both visits. By 1976, Cosimo Commisso was considered by the police to be a capo bastone (underboss) in the Siderno group.  

By the end of the 1970s, the Commissos had put together a criminal enterprise that "rivalled the best of the Sicilian Mafia structures existing in the United States and which was, in terms of pure muscle and audacity, one of the most powerful mafia groups in Canada". They "controlled a criminal organization that imported and distributed heroin with the Vancouver mob and the Calabrian Mafia in Italy, fenced stolen goods across North America, printed and distributed counterfeit money throughout Canada and the United States, ran a vast extortion network in Ontario, arranged insurance and land frauds in the Toronto area, and engaged in contract killings and contract-enforcement work across Canada and the United States – the whole gamut of violent criminal activities one usually associates with the Mafia".

The Satan's Choice MC hitman Cecil Kirby who worked for Cosimo Commisso in Canada from 1976–81 wrote in his 1986 autobiography Mafia Enforcer: "Cosimo wasn't tough-he was homicidal. He'd kill you as soon as you were looking at him if he thought you were crossing him, if he thought it was good for business, or if he thought you insulted him or his family. The lives of other people meant nothing to him".

In the 1980s, the Buffalo crime family also operated in Toronto and Hamilton, and hired Kirby to kill Paul Volpe and his driver Pietro Scarcella in an arrangement with Rocco Remo and Cosimo Commisso, for $20,000. However, the plot was foiled when Kirby turned Royal Canadian Mounted Police informant. Volpe, who had a reputation for being devious and treacherous, had involved the Commissos in a real estate deal and cheated them, causing them to vow vengeance. During a conversation on 31 March 1981, Commisso told Kirby that he needed the approval of an unnamed higher authority before he could give the orders to kill Volpe. When Kirby asked "What about Volpe?", Commisso replied: "I'm waiting for an answer, OK?" On 23 April 1981, Commisso told Kirby that Scarcella could not be killed until he received permission from the unnamed authority, but he had the approval to kill Volpe. Commisso stated: "Ah, Scarcella, forget about it for now. Just don't worry about it for now", leading Kirby to ask "For how long?". Commisso replied: "A month, two months, we don't know yet. There's another guy". When Kirby asked "What the fuck is going on?", Commisso answered: "There's another guy I want you to take care of instead of him." Wearing a wire, Kirby went to the house of Rocco Remo Commisso on 16 May 1981 to tell him: "Volpe, he's dead...I just killed him a hour ago". In fact, Volpe and his wife were in hiding at the RCMP's Toronto office. Commisso asked for proof that Kirby had indeed killed Volpe, leading him to produce Volpe's wallet with his driver's license in it, which Kirby said he had taken from his corpse. After looking over the wallet, Commisso was finally satisfied that Kirby had killed Volpe. After complaining that he should not have come to his house, Commisso paid Kirby $1,000, and said he would have more money for him soon. Commisso repeatedly assured Kirby that he and his brothers "would take care" of him. In organized crime, excessive displays of affection and loyalty are often a sign that those displaying the sympathy are in fact planning to kill the seeming object of their affection, and Kirby was disturbed by the number of times Commisso told him that he was almost family to him and his brothers.

As a result of Kirby's testimony, Rocco Remo and Cosimo Commisso were convicted of conspiracy to murder, counselling to commit murder, possession of property obtained by crime, conspiracy to commit extortion, counselling another person to commit an indictable offence, causing bodily harm, and conspiracy to commit fraud, and sentenced to 14 and a half years and 21 years, respectively. The judge who sentenced the three Commisso brothers in 1982, Justice Gregory Evans, stated: "This is a gangster case. It is a contract killing case and we can feel little clemency or mercy with those involved in this case." During his time at the Kingston penitentiary, Rocco Remo Commisso worked in the prison library and was considered to be one of the more well read and intelligent prisoners at Kingston.

Antonio Commisso was first arrested in 1999. While awaiting appeal, he regularly had to report to police, was subject to a strict night-time curfew, and was prohibited from leaving town. On April 15, 2004, Commisso was definitively convicted and sentenced to seven years and 10 months for Mafia association and trafficking in weapons. When police arrived at his home to arrest him, he was nowhere to be found. On May 14, 2004, he presented himself to the Canadian immigration officials at Montréal–Trudeau International Airport, and the Canadian authorities had no choice but to admit him because he had been granted permanent residency status in Canada in 1974, when he was 18. According to the Siderno police force, "the criminal minds of Siderno are in Canada". After being on the list of most wanted fugitives in Italy, living in Canada for more than a year, Antonio Commisso was arrested at his residence on June 28, 2005 in Woodbridge, Ontario, on an extradition warrant issued in Canada at the request of the Italian government. The federal government was already taking steps to have Commisso permanently deported from the country.

Antonio Coluccio of Richmond Hill, Ontario was one of 29 people named in arrest warrants in Italy in September 2014. Police said they were part of the Commisso 'ndrina. In July 2018, Coluccio was sentenced to 30 years in prison for corruption in Italy. His two brothers were already in prison due to Mafia-related convictions. 

On June 28, 2018, Cosimo Ernesto Commisso, of Woodbridge, Ontario and an unrelated female were shot and killed. According to sources contacted by the Toronto Star, "Commisso was related to "The Quail" of Siderno, Italy, who has had relations in Ontario, is considered by police to be a "'Ndrangheta organized crime boss". The National Post reported that Cosimo Ernesto Commisso, while not a known criminal, "shares a name and family ties with a man who has for decades been reputed to be a Mafia leader in the Toronto area".

References

Books and articles

 Gratteri, Nicola & Antonio Nicaso (2006). Fratelli di Sangue, Cosenza: Luigi Pellegrini Editore 

 Schneider, Stephen (2009). Iced: The Story of Organized Crime in Canada, Mississauga (Ontario): John Wiley and Sons, 

 
Gangs in Toronto